Duer is a surname. Notable people with the name include:

 Alice Duer Miller (1874–1942), American poet 
 Alva Duer (1904–1987), American college basketball coach
 Carolina Duer (born 1978), Argentine world champion boxer
 Caroline King Duer (1865–1956), American editor and writer
 John Duer (1782–1858), American attorney and jurist
 John Duer Irving (1874–1918), American geologist
 Katherine Duer Mackay (1878–1930), American suffragist and socialite
Melinda Duer, British chemist
 Roland Duer Irving (1847–1888), American geologist
 Thomas Duer Broughton (1778–1835), English soldier and writer
 William Duer (Continental Congressman) (1743–1799), British–American lawyer, developer, and land speculator
 William Duer (U.S. Congressman) (1805–1879), American lawyer and statesman
 William Alexander Duer (1780–1858), American lawyer and judge